Carmen Irina Cabezas Rodríguez (born 26 November 1971) is an Ecuadorian politician and educator. She was the secretary of the "Toda Una Vida" plan.

Biography

Beginnings in PAIS Alliance
Cabezas entered politics in Ecuador during the general election of 2006 as a member of PAIS Alliance in Tungurahua Province. In January 2007, after winning the confidence of provincial prefect Fernando González, she was appointed to a public office in Ambato. Within a few months of this, she joined the Ecuadorian Constituent Assembly as the representative of Tungurahua.

In 2011 in the power struggle that saw Rafael Correa take over the leadership of the Alianza Pais party, a National board was created. Soliz was one of the 22 members of that board which included Doris Soliz, Nancy Morocho, María Luisa Moreno, Dora Aguirre , Jorge Loor, Gabriela Rivadeneira and Patricia Sarzoza.

She would later become President of the Permanent Specialized Commission for Food Sovereignty and Development of the Agriculture and Fisheries, under the jurisdiction of the Assembly.

During her time in the Assembly, Cabezas promoted several of the key reforms of the government of Rafael Correa such as the eradication of the outsourcing of Ecuadorian labor and new regulations on mining and public enterprises. She also exerted some influence on other issues of the Correa's government, notably the trial of the former Attorney General  and former Minister of Public Works and Transport, Jorge Marún. Her work in the Assembly would help Cabezas to climb the ladder of the Alliance PAIS and become a close confidant of President Correa.

Controversy over salary increase
In February 2011, Guayaquil-based newspaper El Universo published an investigative piece that uncovered a large increase in Cabezas's salary from $49,000 to $95,000 in a single year, which was not substantiated by Cabeza's assets. In addition, it was found that she had purchased a house in an exclusive neighborhood of Quito for $195,000. Included in the evidence against Cabezas were numerous donations made by relatives of César Mancheno to Cabezas's campaign.

Cabezas responded to El Universos article by presenting slides showing her income and disbursements made to her in recent years during a press conference and denying any links to Mancheno. She did not allow any questions from attending journalists, and when pressed about the increase to her patrimonial assets, Cabezas left the conference room.

Later political life
In March 2014, President Rafael Correa named Cabezas as Ecuador's ambassador to Honduras. She assumed the position in June, becoming the first ambassador of Ecuador to Honduras since the previous ambassador was withdrawn amidst the 2009 Honduran coup d'état. In December of that year, Honduran deputy Osman Aguilar accused Cabezas of meddling in the internal politics of Honduras by publicly supporting the reelection campaign of Juan Orlando Hernández and acting as a consultant to the central government. Cabezas denied advising the Honduran government on political issues and asserted that relations between Honduras and Ecuador were purely for cooperation on social issues.

At the end of May 2017, Cabezas was named the secretary of President Lenín Moreno's "Toda Una Vida" plan.

Citations

Living people
1971 births
Members of the National Congress (Ecuador)
Women members of the National Assembly (Ecuador)
PAIS Alliance politicians
Ambassadors of Ecuador to Honduras
Ecuadorian women ambassadors
21st-century Ecuadorian women politicians
21st-century Ecuadorian politicians